Åsa Natacha Linderborg (née Andersson, born 20 May 1968) is a Swedish writer, columnist and  historian . She writes regularly for Aftonbladet, where she works as chief cultural editor.

Åsa Linderborg was born in the city of Västerås, where she also grew up. Her father worked as a metalworker and her mother, Tanja Linderborg, is a former politician and Member of Parliament for the Left Party. Åsa Linderborg herself became a member of the Left Party – Communists in 1980 and the following year of its youth wing, the Communist Youth. In 1987, she became an ombudsman for the Communist Youth in Mälardalen.
Linderborg graduated with a Ph.D. in history from Uppsala University in 2001 with the dissertation Socialdemokraterna skriver historia: Historieskrivning som ideologisk maktresurs ("Social Democrats Write History: History Writing Used as an Ideological Power Resource"), about the Swedish Social Democratic Party.

Mig äger ingen (Nobody Owns Me), was released. The book received good reviews and was nominated for the August Prize in the category best Swedish-language novel of the year. The book was later the basis for a film of the same name starring Mikael Persbrandt.

On 27 March 2008, Linderborg was presented as the new deputy cultural editor of Aftonbladet, with Karin Magnusson becoming the chief cultural editor. In 2009 Linderborg replaced Magnusson as chief cultural editor. Shortly after she moved into this position, the Aftonbladet-Israel controversy erupted due to an article published in Aftonbladet's culture pages on alleged Israeli organ harvesting from Palestinians.

In 2017, accusations of misconduct were published under her responsibility against the theatre director Benny Fredriksson, 
forcing him to resign, and apparently leading to his suicide three months later.

Awards 
 2007 – ABF:s litteraturpris
 2007 – BMF-plaketten
 2007 – Lundequistska bokhandelns litteraturpris
 2008 – Ivar Lo-Johanssons personliga pris

References 

1968 births
Living people
People from Västerås
Swedish communists
Left Party (Sweden) politicians
21st-century Swedish historians
Swedish women non-fiction writers
Swedish political writers
21st-century Swedish novelists
Swedish women novelists
Writers from Västmanland
Uppsala University alumni
Swedish women historians